The 2019 Syracuse Orange women's soccer team represented Syracuse University during the 2019 NCAA Division I women's soccer season.  The Orange were led by head coach Nicky Adams, in her first season.  They played home games at SU Soccer Stadium.  This is the team's 23rd season playing organized women's college soccer, and their 7th playing in the Atlantic Coast Conference.

The Orange finished the season 3–11–2 overall, and 1–7–1 in ACC play to finish in thirteenth place.  They did not qualify for the ACC Tournament and were not invited to the NCAA Tournament.

Squad

Roster

Updated November 18, 2019

Team management

Source:

Schedule

Source:

|-
!colspan=6 style=""| Non-Conference Regular season

|-
!colspan=6 style=""| ACC Regular season

Rankings

References

Syracuse
Syracuse Orange women's soccer seasons
2019 in sports in New York (state)